The 2023 season will be Viking's 5th consecutive year in the Eliteserien, and their 73rd season in the top flight of Norwegian football. The club is participating in the Eliteserien, the 2022–23 Norwegian Football Cup and the 2023 Norwegian Football Cup. It is the club's third season with Bjarte Lunde Aarsheim and Morten Jensen as managers.

Squad

Out on loan

Transfers

Transfers in

Transfers out

Loans out

Friendlies

Pre-season
The following friendly matches will be played in pre-season.

Competitions

Eliteserien

Table

Results summary

Results by round

Matches
The Eliteserien fixtures were announced on 9 December 2022.

Norwegian Cup

2022–23

The tournament continued from the 2022 season. The draw for the fourth round was made on 24 August 2022. The draw for the quarter-finals was made on 19 January 2023.

Squad statistics

Appearances and goals

|}

References

Viking FK seasons
Viking